Route 169 begins south of Lac Saint-Jean, Quebec, Canada, at Route 175. It proceeds north to Lac Saint-Jean at Alma and encircles the lake, returning to Alma and its terminus in Hebertville.

Municipalities along Route 169

 Lac-Pikauba
 Lac-Jacques-Cartier
 Mont-Apica
 Lac-Achouakan
 Belle-Rivière
 Hébertville
 Métabetchouan–Lac-à-la-Croix
 Desbiens
 Chambord
 Roberval
 Saint-Prime
 Saint-Félicien
 Normandin
 Albanel
 Dolbeau-Mistassini
 Sainte-Jeanne-d'Arc
 Peribonka
 Sainte-Monique
 Saint-Henri-de-Taillon
 Alma
 Saint-Bruno
 Hébertville-Station
 Hébertville

See also
 List of Quebec provincial highways

References

External links 
 Interactive Provincial Route Map (Transports Québec) 
 Route 169 on Google Maps

169
Alma, Quebec
Dolbeau-Mistassini
Roberval, Quebec
Saint-Félicien, Quebec
Roads in Saguenay–Lac-Saint-Jean
Laurentides Wildlife Reserve